Samma may refer to:

 Samma (tribe), a Sindhi clan in Pakistan and India
 Samma, Estonia, a village in Viru-Nigula Parish, Lääne-Viru County, Estonia
 Samma, Jordan, a village in Irbid Governorate, northern Jordan
 Samma dynasty, a 14th century dynasty in Sindh, parts of Balochistan and Punjab
 Sultan Samma (born 1986), Indonesian footballer

See also